The Wager is a 1998 short film, running approximately 19 minutes. The film was directed by Aaron Woodley, and it starred Peter Blais, Barclay Hope, and Valerie Boyle.  was the film's executive producer.

Synopsis
A dark and humorous suspense drama which begins late one night as Richard is entering his apartment. He encounters an odd man dressed in his underwear and holding a box. The stranger proposes a series of morbid wagers referring to what may be hiding within. Each one is more disturbing and profound than the previous, and all lead toward a life-or-death gamble and a startling, unexpected conclusion.

External links

1998 films
1998 short films
Films directed by Aaron Woodley